Scopula molaris is a moth of the  family Geometridae. It is found in South Africa.

References

Endemic moths of South Africa
Moths described in 1922
molaris
Moths of Africa